Universidad de los Andes (UANDES) is a private Christian (catholic) inspired higher learning institution that carries out non-profit education, research, and assistance activities. Founded in 1989 in Santiago de Chile by a group of academics and professionals.

UANDES is currently accredited by the National Accreditation Commission for a period of 5 years out of a maximum of 7 in five areas: Pre and Postgraduate Teaching, Research, Community Engagement, and Institutional Management. 
Since 2019 it is a member of the Council of Chancellors (CRUCH).

History 
The University was founded on September 8, 1989, by a group of businessmen and academics, among whom were businessmen Eduardo Fernández León, Matías Izquierdo Menéndez and Eduardo Gulisasti Gana. 
<p>
The Faculty of Law was the first to begin, in 1990, followed by the Medical Faculty and the Institute of Philosophy. Over the years, new majors were added on today reaching a total of 22 undergraduate majors, 10 associate degree programs, 1,700 academics, 4 Ph.D.’s, 8 postgraduate programs, 21 master's programs, 25 advanced study programs and 27 specialties in the health field.

Students 
Its 9,000 students are currently studying one of the 28 undergraduate majors it offers in the fields of humanities, engineering, and healthcare, and 11 associate degree programs. Its postgraduate programs, which include PhD, master, and medical specialty programs, have over 1,500 students enrolled. Located on its sole campus are the Clinica Universidad de los Andes, the CiiB (Center for Research and Biomedical Innovation) and the ESE Business School. The Universidad de los Andes Health Center 1, located in the district of San Bernardo in southern Santiago, was also created as a service to the local community as well as a hands-on teaching facility.

Infrastructure 
On the San Carlos de Apoquindo Campus, the University has nine buildings, including the ESE Business School, the Engineering building, a library, the Central Building, which houses the offices of most of the support units, classrooms, a degree room, and academic staff offices. 
It also has two clinical halls of its own, one of them is a health center located in San Bernardo 7
and Clinica Universidad de los Andes, which is integrated onto the university campus.

Chancellors

	1989-1998: Raúl Bertelsen Repetto
	1999-2003: Oscar Cristi Marfil
	2004-2013: Orlando Poblete Iturrate
	2014-To date: José Antonio Guzmán Cruzat

Academic Programs and Schools
Universidad de los Andes offers 29 undergraduate degrees leading to professional degrees. It also dictates 11 associate degree programs, which can be continued here or at other higher learning institutions.

Health Department
Universidad de los Andes was the first private Chilean university not belonging to the Council of Chancellors (CRUCH) to teach Medicine. 

	Medicine
	Dentistry 
	Nutrition and Dietetics
	Nursing
	Psychology
	Physical Therapy
	Occupational Therapy
	Speech Therapy
	Obstetrics and Childcare

Engineering and Administration Department
	Service Administration
	Business Administration
	Environmental Civil Engineering
	Civil Engineering in Public Works
	Industrial Civil Engineering
	Electrical Civil Engineering
	Civil Engineering in Computer Science

Humanities Department
	Law
	Journalism
	Philosophy
	Literature
	History
	Advertising
	Media & Communications

Education Department
	Early Childhood Education
	Elementary Education
	Bilingual Elementary Education
	High School Education 
	High School Education in Roman Catholic Theology
	In 2018 enrollments were closed and with it the majors for High School History, Literature and Philosophy.

Associate Degree programs
	Associate Degree in Medicine
	Associate Degree in Dentistry
	Associate Degree in Psychology
	Associate Degree in Service Administration
	Associate Degree in Nursing 
	Associate Degree in Engineering
	Associate Degree in Business Administration
	Associate Degree in Civil Engineering
	Associate Degree in Humanities
	Associate Degree in Law
	Associate Degree in Healthcare
	Associate Degree in Obstetrics and Childcare

Faculties and Academic Units
Currently, the university has nine faculties, eleven schools and three other independently governed academic units:
	School of Service Administration
	Service Administration
	School of Psychology
	Psychology
	Faculty of Economics and Business
	Business Administration
	Faculty of Communications
	Media & Communications
	Journalism
	Advertising
	Faculty of Law 
	Law
	Faculty of Education 
	Early Childhood Education
	Elementary Education
	High School Education
	Bilingual Elementary Education
	High School Education in Roman Catholic Theology
	Faculty of Nursing and Midwifery
	School of Nursing
	School of Obstetrics and Childcare
	Faculty of Philosophy and Humanities
	Institute of History
	Institute of Philosophy
	Institute of Literature
	Faculty of Engineering and Applied Sciences
	Environmental Civil Engineering
	Civil Engineering in Public Works
	Industrial Civil Engineering
	Electrical Civil Engineering
	Civil Engineering in Computer Science
	Faculty of Medicine
	School of Speech Therapy
	School of Physical Therapy
	School of Medicine
	School of Nutrition and Dietetics
	School of Occupational Therapy
	Faculty of Dentistry
	Dentistry 
	Institute of Family Sciences
	Associate Degree Programs
	Associate Degree in Service Administration
	Associate Degree in Law
	Associate Degree in Nursing 
	Associate Degree in Humanities
	Associate Degree in Engineering
	Associate Degree in Business Administration
	Associate Degree in Healthcare
	Associate Degree in Medicine
	Associate Degree in Dentistry
	Associate Degree in Obstetrics and Childcare
	Associate Degree in Psychology
	Center for General Studies

International Agreements
The University has a significant number of international agreements with universities around the world and houses different Research Centers and Institutes.

Notable alumni
List of Students of Universidad de los Andes (Chile)

Politics
 Joaquín Lavín León
 Lucia Pinto

Journalism
 Manuel de Tezanos-Pinto
 María Luisa Godoy
 Catalina Edwards

Film
 Guillermo Amoedo
 Lorenza Izzo

Law
 Carlos Charme
 Jorge Alessandri Vergara
 Felipe Ward
 Felipe Alessandri
 José Luis Uriarte
 Enrique Guzmán Blanco
 Alejandro Rubilar Camurri

Student Participation
In 2012, the first election for a Student Federation was held, resulting in the election of the "Construye" ( Build) list led by civil engineering student Nicolás Peñafiel. Currently, the Student Federation is represented by Ignacio Cruz (MED). 

Some past student federation presidents have been:
	2020: Ignacio Cruz (MED), University Renewal Movement.
	2019: Florencia Barañao (NUR), Create Uandes Movement.
	2018: Valentina Guerrero (LAW), Forward Uandes Movement.
	2017: Álvaro Arriagada (BA), Create Uandes Movement.
	2016: Vicente Chomon (LAW), Forward Uandes Movement.
	2015: Patricio Werner (MED), Student Council chosen by the presidents of the various student councils.
	2014: Constanza Astorga (NUR), Build Uandes Movement.
	2013: María Teresa Urrutia (LAW), Build Uandes Movement.
	2012: Nicolás Peñafiel (ENG), Build Uandes Movement.

References

External links
Official Spanish language Website
English Version
Business Schools in Chile

University of the Andes, Chile
Andes
Business schools in Chile
Educational institutions established in 1989
1989 establishments in Chile